The 2020 Super GT Series was motor racing championship based in Japan for grand touring cars. The series is sanctioned by the Japan Automobile Federation (JAF) and run by the GT Association (GTA). It was the twenty-eighth season of the Japan Automobile Federation Super GT Championship which includes the All Japan Grand Touring Car Championship (JGTC) era and the sixteenth season the series to compete under the Super GT name. It was the thirty-eighth overall season of a JAF national sportscar championship dating back to the All Japan Sports Prototype Championship.

Team Kunimitsu and drivers Naoki Yamamoto and Tadasuke Makino won the Drivers' and Teams' Championships in GT500 for Honda and their new NSX-GT with a front-engine layout. They clinched the championship in the final lap of the final race of the season, after championship rivals TGR Team KeePer TOM's and driver Ryo Hirakawa ran out of fuel at the final corner. Nissan customer racing team Kondo Racing and drivers Kiyoto Fujinami and João Paulo Lima de Oliveira won the GT300 class championships in the second-generation GT-R NISMO GT3.

Schedule

Initial 2020 schedule 
On July 26, 2019, the GTA announced the provisional calendar for the 2020 Super GT series, with the number of rounds remaining at 8, but with an increase in the number of overseas races, with the return of Chang International Circuit in Thailand, and for the first time since 2013 Super GT Series, a return to Sepang International Circuit, in Malaysia. Despite its absence in the calendar, Sepang had remained a popular choice for manufacturers when reviewing locations for testing, particularly during the winter months. At the time, dates for neither of the overseas rounds were revealed, although the races were expected to take place between June and August. The  round, introduced to replace the 1000 km of Suzuka, was dropped to avoid a clash with the 2020 Summer Olympics, which would be held in Tokyo. A finalised calendar with the dates for both overseas rounds was revealed during the 2019 Motegi GT 250 km weekend.

Impact of 2019-20 coronavirus pandemic 
On March 18, 2020, the original opening round at Okayama International Circuit was postponed to an undetermined date due to the 2019-20 coronavirus pandemic.  On March 30, 2020, the second and third rounds at Fuji Speedway and Suzuka Circuit were each postponed.  On April 5, 2020, the series released its first revised calendar, which was scheduled to begin on July 12 at Okayama. With the 2020 Summer Olympics postponed, the Fuji Speedway round, traditionally scheduled for the Golden Week holiday of May 4, was moved to August 9.

On June 4, 2020, a second revision to the calendar was announced. The season is now scheduled to begin on July 19 at Fuji Speedway, the first of three confirmed races that were announced to be held at Fuji, with a fourth added later. Two rounds were scheduled to take place at Suzuka Circuit, with one scheduled for August 23, the date that was originally set for the cancelled 2020 Suzuka 10 Hours. Two rounds were scheduled to take place at Twin Ring Motegi. The rounds at Okayama International Circuit, Autopolis, and Sportsland Sugo in Japan, as well as the round at Sepang International Circuit in Malaysia, were all cancelled for 2020. On June 8, 2020, it was confirmed that the eighth and final round would take place at Fuji Speedway on November 29, after the round at Chang International Circuit in Thailand, which was provisionally scheduled to take place on December 27, was cancelled. The first event format was announced on June 29, with the first race at Fuji being held at a 300 kilometre distance.

This season saw a number of corporate sponsors purchasing naming rights for individual rounds. Oono Associates purchased naming rights for all four rounds held at Fuji Speedway, under their Takanokono Hotel property based in Matsuyama, Japan. Steel manufacturer Fujimaki Group purchased naming rights for the two rounds held at Suzuka Circuit and Twin Ring Motegi.

Teams and drivers
A total of 45 teams registered to take part in the 2020 Super GT season, 15 teams from the GT500 class, and 30 teams from the GT300 class.

GT500

GT300

Vehicle Changes

GT500 Class 

 All GT500 vehicles will be prepared to the unified Class One technical regulations created by the GTA and the Deutsche Tourenwagen Masters' sanctioning body, the ITR. The cars will feature a standard engine control unit (ECU) manufactured by Bosch, who joined Super GT as a sponsor of the series from 2020.
 After being represented by the Lexus brand from 2006 to 2019, Toyota Motor Corporation will field the fifth-generation Toyota GR Supra in the GT500 Class, beginning in 2020. The GR Supra will be powered by the same Toyota RI4A powerplant used in its predecessors, the Lexus RC F, and the Lexus LC 500. To reflect the change, all six of Toyota's GT500 entries will carry the "TGR Team" prefix in their team names.
 After a change in the GT500 technical regulations that state that the engine must be mounted in front of the cockpit, Honda announced that they will field a front-engined version of the traditionally mid-engined NSX-GT in 2020. It will be the first Honda GT500 car with a front-engine layout since the HSV-010 GT raced from 2010 to 2013.
 Nissan will field an updated version of the GT-R NISMO GT500 in 2020.

GT300 Class 

 Saitama Toyopet GreenBrave will field the fifth-generation Toyota GR Supra in the GT300 Class from 2020. Built to JAF-GT GT300 regulations, the GT300 GR Supra will be powered by Toyota's 5.4 litre 2UR-GSE V8 engine.
 On December 6, 2019, Tsuchiya Engineering announced a customer racing partnership with Porsche to field the latest 911 GT3-R in the 2020 season.
 X Works Racing will change from the Nissan GT-R NISMO GT3 to the Audi R8 LMS GT3 in 2020.

Team Changes

GT500 Class 

 2019 GT500 Championship winners Team Le Mans parted ways with Toyota Gazoo Racing at the end of the season. To replace their entry, a new team, "TGR Team Wako's Rookie," was announced for 2020. The new team is owned by KTR Co. Ltd, with vehicle maintenance being handled by TGR Team Cerumo. Wako Chemical, the title sponsor of Team Le Mans from 2016 to 2019, will be the title sponsor of the new team, and 2005 GT500 Drivers' Champion, Toranosuke Takagi, will be the Team Director. TGR Team Wako's Rookie will carry the number 14, and for the first time since 1998, the number one plate, reserved for the GT500 Champion team, will not be in use. 
 Three-time GT500 Drivers' Champion Juichi Wakisaka, who was the Team Director at Team Le Mans from 2016 to 2019, now takes over the same position at TGR Team SARD.
 Red Bull have become the title sponsor of Team Mugen, beginning in 2020.
Masanori Sekiya resigned as Executive Director of TGR Team TOM's, effective 31 March.

GT300 Class 

 On January 29, 2020, Tsuchiya Engineering announced an expanded partnership with title sponsor Hoppy Beverage Company, with Hoppy CEO Mina Ishiwatari purchasing a share of the team, and changed their name to "Hoppy Team Tsuchiya."
 Aston Martin Racing customer squad D'station Racing will partner with Pacific Racing under the new name "Pacific-D'station Racing" in 2020, and changed their number from 7 to 9. They will also be the first full-time GT300 entry to run on Michelin tyres since 2014.
 Max Racing, who had competed in the Pirelli Super Taikyu Series' ST-X (FIA GT3) category from 2018 to 2019, announced that they will move up to the GT300 class of Super GT beginning in 2020. Former Super GT driver Tetsuya Tanaka was appointed team director, and the aforementioned Tsuchiya Engineering will be in charge of vehicle maintenance. They will field a Lexus RC F GT3, running on Yokohama tyres.
 INGING Motorsport will return to the GT300 class as a stand-alone entry in 2020, fielding a Toyota 86 MC previously used by Panther arto Team Thailand. They will carry the number 6, the number which they had previously used in the 1998 All-Japan GT Championship and had since been used by Team Le Mans until their split from Toyota. Their 86 MC will run on Bridgestone Potenza tyres.
 Team Le Mans announced that they will take over vehicle maintenance and operation for Audi Team Hitotsuyama beginning in 2020.
 BMW Team Studie will enter the GT300 class for the first time since 2017 under the name "BMW Team Studie x CSL", using the current BMW M6 GT3. Kazumichi Goh, the owner of Team Goh Motorsports (who entered Super GT in 2019 as McLaren Customer Racing Japan), was appointed as the Representative Director of the team.
 Lexus Customer Racing teams K-Tunes Racing and LM Corsa will change tyre suppliers for the 2020 season: K-Tunes Racing will switch from Bridgestone to Dunlop, and LM Corsa will switch from Dunlop to Michelin.
Panther arto Team Thailand was renamed arto Ping An Team Thailand, reflecting an increased sponsorship agreement from the Chinese insurance company.

Driver Changes

GT500 Class 

 Honda: On October 29, 2019, 2018 GT500 Drivers' Champion Jenson Button announced that he would not return to race in Super GT in 2020. One month later, during the Super GT x DTM Dream Race at Fuji Speedway, Team Mugen driver Daisuke Nakajima announced that he would retire from racing at the conclusion of the event, while Narain Karthikeyan, who won the second Dream Race at Fuji for Nakajima Racing, confirmed in January that he would not return to the series. On January 10, 2020, Honda appointed three new drivers to their GT500 lineup. Reigning Formula 3 Asian Championship and Porsche Carrera Cup Japan Champion, Ukyo Sasahara, joined Team Mugen to replace Nakajima. Reigning GT300 Drivers' Champion, Nirei Fukuzumi, was promoted by Autobacs Racing Team Aguri (ARTA) to their GT500 car, replacing veteran Takuya Izawa, who moved to Nakajima Racing in an all-new driver lineup alongside fellow GT300 graduate, Hiroki Otsu. Tadasuke Makino, who drove for Nakajima Racing in 2019, transferred to Team Kunimitsu in 2020, in place of Button.
 Nissan: On December 7, 2019, Porsche factory driver Frédéric Makowiecki returned to the IMSA WeatherTech Sports Car Championship full-time in 2020, ruling him out for a full-time return to Super GT. His departure from Nissan was confirmed on January 10, 2020, along with that of James Rossiter, who has ended his career in Japan after seven seasons to focus on his role with the DS Techeetah Formula E Team. Katsumasa Chiyo, who raced full-time in the Intercontinental GT Challenge for Nissan in 2019, returns to GT500 on a full-time basis at NDDP Racing with B-Max, replacing Makowiecki. At Team Impul, Kazuki Hiramine steps up from the GT300 class after six seasons, to replace Rossiter.
 Toyota: Toyota Gazoo Racing announced their 2020 motorsport activities on February 7, 2020. The new TGR Team Wako's Rookie entry will feature 2019 GT500 Champion Kazuya Oshima and 2018 All-Japan Formula Three Champion Sho Tsuboi as its drivers. Tsuboi's place at TGR Team WedsSport Bandoh will be taken by GT300 graduate and 2019 All-Japan F3 vice-champion Ritomo Miyata, the first person on the autism spectrum to race full-time in the premier class of Super GT. 2019 All-Japan F3 Champion, Sacha Fenestraz, also steps up to the GT500 class, driving for TGR Team au TOM's. Two-time 24 Hours of Le Mans winner Kazuki Nakajima and 2019 GT500 Champion Kenta Yamashita will not return to the series in 2020, as they will focus solely on their roles in the FIA World Endurance Championship and Japanese Super Formula Championship.

GT300 Class 

 2014 Le Mans class winner and Aston Martin factory driver Nicki Thiim was scheduled to join Pacific-D'station Racing for 2020, alongside Tomonobu Fujii.
 Two-time Nürburgring 24 Hours winner Christopher Mies and former Team Taisan driver Shintaro Kawabata were announced at Audi Team Hitotsuyama, to replace 2004 GT500 Champion Richard Lyons , and Ryuchiro Tomita, who would join Audi Sport Team WRT in the SRO GT World Challenge Europe Sprint Cup.
 Lamborghini Squadra Corse driver Dennis Lind was scheduled to join Team JLOC in their number 87 entry alongside Yuya Motojima. 2010 GT500 Champion Takashi Kogure and 2015 GT300 Champion André Couto were announced in the number 88 car.
 With Kazuki Hiramine and Sacha Fenestraz's respective promotions to GT500, Kondo Racing announced a new lineup for their GT300 team, featuring 2010 Japanese Top Formula Champion João Paulo de Oliveira and two-time Fuji 24 Hours winner Kiyoto Fujinami.
 BMW Team Studie x CSL welcomes 2004 24 Hours of Le Mans winner Seiji Ara back to the team, alongside rookie gentleman driver Tomohide Yamaguchi. BMW Works driver Augusto Farfus was announced as a third driver, but did not appear due to COVID-19 travel restrictions.
 Two-time GT500 Champion Masataka Yanagida returned to Super GT full-time at Cars Tokai Dream28, replacing gentleman driver Kazuho Takahashi, who retired from racing in the series and will now focus on his role as team executive.
 All-Japan F3 and Euroformula Open race winner Toshiki Oyu replaced Nirei Fukuzumi at Autobacs Racing Team Aguri in their championship-winning Honda NSX GT3.
 Australian Jake Parsons returned to Super GT after a two-year absence, driving for Modulo Drago Corse alongside owner/driver Ryo Michigami.
 All-Japan F3 graduate Shunsuke Kohno replaced Ritomo Miyata at LM Corsa.
 Kohta Kawaai graduated from the FIA F4 Japanese Championship to drive for Saitama Toyopet GreenBrave.
 Newcomers Max Racing appointed GT300 veteran Rintaro Kubo and FIA F4 Japanese Championship graduate Atsushi Miyake as their drivers.
 INGING Motorsport appointed Toyota Gazoo Racing young driver Kazuto Kotaka and veteran Ryohei Sakaguchi as their full-time driver lineup, joined by third driver Yuui Tsutsumi, who replaced Kotaka for Round 7 at Twin Ring Motegi when Kotaka contracted a high fever.
 All-Japan F3 National Class race winner Kizuku Hirota joined Arnage Racing as a third driver.

Mid-season changes 
Due to travel restrictions put into place as a result of the 2019-20 coronavirus pandemic, several driver changes were necessitated, starting from the opening round at Fuji Speedway.

Heikki Kovalainen was replaced at TGR Team SARD for Round 1 by 2019 GT500 Champion Kenta Yamashita. For Round 2, Kovalainen was replaced by Sena Sakaguchi, before Kovalainen returned to the team at Suzuka Circuit for Round 3.
On 2 November, TGR Team KeePer TOM's announced that Kenta Yamashita will replace Nick Cassidy for the final two races of the season, as Cassidy began preparations for his debut in the 2021 FIA Formula E World Championship.
 arto Ping An Team Thailand missed Round 1 due to several personnel being unable to enter Japan. Upon their return to the series at Round 2, arto Ping An Team Thailand appointed Masahiro Sasaki and Yuui Tsutsumi to drive for the next four rounds. Sean Walkinshaw and Mathias Beche replaced Sasaki and Tsutsumi from Round 6, after both drivers were cleared to cleared to enter Japan.
Nicki Thiim was unable to race with Pacific-D'station Racing in 2020. He was replaced for the first four rounds by Kei Cozzolino. Cozzolino then split the last four races with TCR Japan Series driver Takuro Shinohara, who entered Rounds 5 and 8 at Fuji.
 Porsche Carrera Cup Japan champion Tsubasa Kondo replaced Christopher Mies at Audi Team Hitotsuyama for the full season.
With André Couto and Dennis Lind unable to race with JLOC in 2020, JLOC moved Yuya Motojima to the number 88 car to partner Takashi Kogure. Tsubasa Takahashi and Shinnosuke Yamada were appointed as the new drivers of the number 87 car.
 X Works Racing hired multiple replacement drivers to partner Shaun Thong. Takuro Shinohara drove in Round 1. Ex-Formula Renault Eurocup driver Hiroyuki Matsumura was entered for Round 2, but failed to pass his rookie certification test during practice. Takeshi Kimura of CarGuy Racing then entered Rounds 3 & 4. Kota Sasaki , the 2005 GT300 Champion, was appointed for the remaining four rounds.
After Sena Sakaguchi was called up to TGR Team SARD for Round 2, K-Tunes Racing appointed Shigekazu Wakisaka to replace him in the same event.
 After the fourth round of the season, Arnage Racing driver Ryosei Yamashita announced that he would be taking a hiatus from racing to focus on his family's business activities. Kizuku Hirota and Hideto Yasuoka split the remaining four races in place of Yamashita.
FIA F4 Japanese Championship race winner Takuya Otaki joined Tomei Sports for Rounds 6 and 7.
NILZZ Racing appointed Yusaku Shibata to drive in Round 6 at Suzuka Circuit. For Round 7, they appointed Ryuichiro Tomita, who had just completed his first GT World Challenge campaign in Europe.
Defending GT300 Champion Shinichi Takagi was injured in a Pirelli Super Taikyu Series crash at Okayama International Speedway on 1 November. FIA Formula 2 race winner Nobuharu Matsushita was announced as Takagi's replacement at Autobacs Racing Team Aguri for the final two rounds of the season.

Results
Drivers credited with winning Pole Position for their respective teams are indicated in bold text.

Championship Standings

Drivers' championships

Scoring system

GT500

GT300

References

External links 
 Super GT Official Website

Super GT seasons
Super GT Series
Super GT Series